German submarine U-929 was a Type VIIC/41 U-boat of Nazi Germany's Kriegsmarine during World War II.

She was ordered on 2 April 1942, and was laid down on 20 March 1943, at Neptun Werft AG, Rostock, as yard number 516. She was  commissioned under the command of Oberleutnant zur See Werner Schulz on 6 September 1944.

Design
German Type VIIC/41 submarines were preceded by the heavier Type VIIC submarines. U-929 had a displacement of  when at the surface and  while submerged. She had two shafts and two  propellers.

U-929 was fitted with five  torpedo tubes (four fitted at the bow and one at the stern), fourteen torpedoes, one  SK C/35 naval gun, (220 rounds), one  Flak M42 and two  C/30 anti-aircraft guns. The boat had a complement of between forty-four and fifty-two.

Service history
U-929 was scuttled north of Warnemünde on 1 May 1945, before she could participate in any war patrols.

She originally laid at position , before being raised in 1956, and broken up.

See also
 Battle of the Atlantic

References

Bibliography

German Type VIIC/41 submarines
U-boats commissioned in 1944
World War II submarines of Germany
1944 ships
World War II shipwrecks in the Baltic Sea
Ships built in Rostock
Operation Regenbogen (U-boat)
Maritime incidents in May 1945
U-boats scuttled in 1945